The San Diego Toros were a professional soccer team based in San Diego, California.  Founded in 1967 as the Los Angeles Toros, the team was one of the ten charter members of the National Professional Soccer League (NPSL).  When the NPSL and the rival United Soccer Association (USA) merged in 1968 to form the North American Soccer League (NASL), the team was relocated to San Diego as a member of the new league. While in Los Angeles, the Toros played its home matches at Los Angeles Memorial Coliseum and at Balboa Stadium when it moved to San Diego. The team folded at the conclusion of the 1968 NASL season.

History
In 1966 several groups of entrepreneurs were exploring the idea of forming a professional soccer league in United States. Two of these groups merged to form the National Professional Soccer League (NPSL) and franchise rights were awarded to ten ownership groups, with one given to Los Angeles Rams owner Dan Reeves.  The Toros secured a lease at the Los Angeles Memorial Coliseum, which would also host the Los Angeles Wolves of the rival USA during the 1967 season.

The Toros began the season on April 16, 1967, with a home 3-2 win against the New York Generals in front of a crowd of over nine thousand.  The team finished the season in fifth place in the Western Division with a record of 7 wins 10 loses and 15 draws with an average attendance for the season of 3,595.  Dan Reeves sold the team to a group that included Bill Cox who acted as general manager.  

With the merger of the NPSL with the United Soccer Association it was announced that Los Angeles would be one of the 20-teams in play in the North American Soccer League (NASL).  Prior to the 1968 season, the Toros were moved to San Diego to avoid the league having two teams in the same market of Los Angeles playing their home games at Balboa Stadium.  Midway through the 1968 NASL season, Cox took a position with the St. Louis Stars and sold the team to Emilio Azcárraga Milmo.  The team finished the season in first place of the Pacific Division with a record of 18 wins, 8 loses and 6 draws earning the highest points total in the league.  The team defeated the Kansas City Spurs with an aggregate score of 2 - 1 over 2 matches in the Conference Finals, but were defeated by the Atlanta Chiefs with an aggregate score of 3 - 0 in the NASL Final 1968.  The Toros were one of 12 teams that folded between the 1968 and 1969 NASL seasons.

Year-by-year

Source:

Notes

References

T
Defunct soccer clubs in California
National Professional Soccer League (1967) franchises
1967 establishments in California
1967 disestablishments in California
North American Soccer League (1968–1984) teams
Soccer clubs in California
1968 establishments in California
1968 disestablishments in California